James Davis Taylor (September 2, 1863 – May 11, 1941) was a Canadian publisher, journalist, soldier and Conservative politician. As a member of the Ottawa Sharpshooters, Taylor was involved in resisting the 1885 North-West Rebellion. As a lieutenant colonel during World War I he commanded the 131st Battalion overseas.

Taylor was MP for New Westminster from 1908 until 1917. Davis was then appointed to the Senate where he served until his death.

References
 

1863 births
1941 deaths
Canadian journalists
People of the North-West Rebellion
Canadian military personnel of World War I
Canadian senators from British Columbia
Conservative Party of Canada (1867–1942) MPs
Conservative Party of Canada (1867–1942) senators
Members of the House of Commons of Canada from British Columbia
Anglophone Quebec people